Daniel Jean Bogdan (born 3 August 1971) is a Romanian former professional footballer who played as a goalkeeper for teams such as FCM Bacău, FC U Craiova or UTA Arad, among others. After retirement, Bogdan was the goalkeeping coach of FCM Bacău during 2009, then in 2015 moved to Republic of Ireland, where he worked until 2017, when he moved again, this time in England, where he works as a driver for a company that has as activity the resale of cars.

Honours
FCM Bacău
Cupa Ligii: 1998

References

External links
 
 

1971 births
Living people
People from Călărași
Romanian footballers
Association football goalkeepers
Liga I players
Liga II players
FCM Bacău players
CSM Focșani players
FC U Craiova 1948 players
FC UTA Arad players
FC Vaslui players